Mellivora sivalensis is an extinct species of mustelid that lived in the Pliocene and is known from the Siwaliks of India and Pakistan.

It is a poorly known species, originally classified as Ursitaxus sivalensis. It was similar to the modern Indian ratel, but was larger and had proportionately larger premolars.

References

Pliocene carnivorans
Prehistoric mustelids
Pliocene mammals of Asia